Lapley, Stretton and Wheaton Aston is a civil parish in the district of South Staffordshire, Staffordshire, England.  It contains 54 listed buildings that are recorded in the National Heritage List for England.  Of these, one is listed at Grade I, the highest of the three grades, four are at Grade II*, the middle grade, and the others are at Grade II, the lowest grade.  The parish contains the villages of Lapley, Stretton, and Wheaton Aston, and the surrounding countryside.  Most of the listed buildings are houses and associated structures, cottages. farmhouses, and farm buildings, the earlier of which are timber framed or have a timber framed core.  The Shropshire Union Canal passes through the parish, and the listed buildings associated with this are bridges, aqueducts and a milepost.  The other listed buildings include churches and items in the churchyards, country houses and associated structures, and a former watermill.


Key

Buildings

References

Citations

Sources

Lists of listed buildings in Staffordshire
South Staffordshire District